Alexander St. Clair House, also known as the Peery House, is a historic home located near Bluefield, Virginia, Tazewell County, Virginia. It was built about 1878 for local resident Alexander St. Clair, and is a large two-story, three-bay, brick I-house dwelling with a two-story rear ell. The roof is sheathed in patterned tin shingles. The front facade features a one-bay Italianate style portico with a second floor balustrade.  Associated with the main house are five contributing buildings and two contributing structures.

The home was listed on the National Register of Historic Places in 1982.

References

Houses on the National Register of Historic Places in Virginia
Italianate architecture in Virginia
Houses completed in 1879
Houses in Tazewell County, Virginia
I-houses in Virginia
National Register of Historic Places in Tazewell County, Virginia